Agnieszka Karpiesiuk (born April 17, 1982) is a Polish athlete, a sprinter, who also competes in the 400 metres hurdles. Karpiesiuk, who represents AZS Gdańsk, was a member of the Polish Team in the 2008 Olympic Games in Beijing. She is the 400-meter indoor champion of Poland (2008), and was a finalist of the 2007 European Indoor Athletics Championships (4 × 400 m) as well as the 2008 IAAF World Indoor Championships.

References

 WAF 2008
 The Sports

1982 births
Living people
Polish female hurdlers
Polish female sprinters
Athletes (track and field) at the 2008 Summer Olympics
Olympic athletes of Poland
People from Ostróda County
Sportspeople from Warmian-Masurian Voivodeship
People from Ostróda